Luisa Wilson San Román (born 5 August 2005) is a Mexican ice hockey player who plays in the U18 AA league (see junior ice hockey) of the Ontario Women's Hockey Association (OWHL) with the North York Storm Prep U18 AA in the North York district of Toronto, Canada. 

Wilson won the gold medal with her team in the girls' girls' 3x3 mixed tournament at the 2020 Winter Youth Olympics in Lausanne, Switzerland, on January 15, 2020, making her the first Mexican to do so. She also competed at the 2020 IIHF World Women's U18 Championship – Division II Group B where she won a bronze medal with the Mexican national under-18 team.

Early life
Luisa Wilson San Román was born on 5 August 2005 in Celaya, Guanajuato to a Mexican mother, Laura San Román and a Canadian father, Brian Wilson, a chiropractor in Mexico City and assistant coach for the Mexico women's national ice hockey team. Wilson has played ice hockey since she was 2 or 3 years old, and she also practiced figure skating.

Career

Lausanne 2020

Wilson was selected to represent Mexico at the 2020 Winter Youth Olympics, in Lausanne, Switzerland, with the Yellow team of the girls' 3x3 mixed ice hockey tournament. Along with athletes from Austria, Belgium, Czech Republic, France, Germany, Italy, the Netherlands, New Zealand, Norway, Spain, South Korea, and Switzerland, Wilson and her team defeated the Black team , achieving the gold medal, thus becoming the first Mexican to win an Olympic medal in a Winter Olympics sport.

2020 IIHF World Women's U18 Championship
Wilson joined the Mexico women's national under-18 ice hockey team and competed at the 2020 IIHF World Women's U18 Championship – Division II. She played in five games and scored two goals overall. The team earned the bronze medal after defeating New Zealand .

Beijing 2022
Wilson said she would have liked to represent Mexico at the 2022 Winter Olympics, which were held in Beijing, China.

Other achievements
Wilson was listed among Forbes 100 Most Powerful Women of Mexico in 2020. Her name is inscribed on the walls of the Olympic Museum, making her the second Mexican woman to receive such honors after Enriqueta Basilio, the first woman to light the Olympic cauldron in 1968.

Personal life
Wilson divides her time living between Toronto, Canada, and Mexico, with her parents and brothers.

References

External links
 
 

2005 births
Ice hockey players at the 2020 Winter Youth Olympics
Living people
Mexican people of Canadian descent
Mexican sportswomen
People from Celaya
Sportspeople from Guanajuato
Ice hockey people from Toronto
Women's ice hockey forwards